The belly harp is a musical instrument found in West Africa (including Nigeria and Liberia) which is a musical bow with a gourd resonator which is held against the body.

Recordings
 Belly Harp. Folk Music of Liberia, Folkways FE 4465 (Side ll, band 3)

References

Liberian music
Harps
African musical instruments